Dance Champions is a dance competition reality television series that was telecasted on 30 September 2017, on Star Plus. This show is produced by Urban Brew. This dance show divides the contestants into few teams which are mentored by a professional dancer.

Dance Champions features champion dancers who won or were runners-up in different shows. Moreover, new challengers will also join them and can beat them by displaying their further level dance moves.

Bir Radha Sherpa is the winner of the show.

Concept
There are two kinds of participants, half of the participants are champions of other dance shows and half are runners up. Every week, there will be a contest between challengers versus champions.

Remo D'Souza and Terence Lewis are the judges of the show who would select contestants for the top list. The hosts are Raghav Juyal and  Ridhima Pandit.

Punit Pathak is the choreographer.

Contestants

Finale results

New entries

Eliminated dancers
Teriya Magar 
13.13 Crew 
V Company 
Proneeta Swargiary 
Piyush & Preeti 
Hip Circle

Scores chart

Weekly scores chart

See also
List of dance style categories
Dance Plus
India's Best Dancer
Super Dancer

References

External links
Dance Champions Streaming on Hotstar
Student Dance Champions Streaming on DanceTV India]

Hindi-language television shows
Indian reality television series
2017 Indian television seasons
StarPlus original programming
Indian dance television shows
Frames Production series